John Charles Manning (born 1962) is a South African botanist based in the Compton Herbarium, South African National Biodiversity Institute, Kirstenbosch, South Africa.

References

External sources

20th-century South African botanists
Botanists with author abbreviations
Living people
1962 births
Place of birth missing (living people)
21st-century South African botanists